Gustavia is a genus of flowering plants in the family Lecythidaceae described by Linnaeus in 1775. It is native to tropical Central America and South America. Many of the species are threatened; some are critically endangered Gustavia superba, though, is actually abundant in re-growing secondary forests.  It grows in northern South America, from Panama south through the Andes as far as Ecuador, and along the Caribbean coast and in the Amazon basin. Gustavia flowers have numerous stamens, in some species as many as 1,200 in a single flower.

The genus name was given by Linnaeus to honor his king, Gustav III of Sweden.

Species

List of species within the genus:

References

 
Ericales genera
Neotropical realm flora
Taxa named by Carl Linnaeus